is a JR West Geibi and Fukuen Line station located in Wachi-chō, Miyoshi, Hiroshima Prefecture, Japan. This station should not be confused with other stations of similar-sounding name on the Geibi Line: Shimowachi, Shiwachi, and Shiwaguchi.

History
1930-04-22: Takō Station opens as part of the Geibi Railway. 
1933-06-01: The Geibi Railway is nationalized and becomes part of the Shōbara Line
1934-01-01: The station name is changed to Shiomachi Station. Until this time, the present Kamisugi Station had been known as Shiomachi Station
1987-04-01: Japan National Railways is privatized, and Shiomachi Station becomes a JR West station

Station building and platform
Shiomachi Station features one raised platform and an island platform, connected by an underground access tunnel completed in 1984. A taxi company located in front of the station sells train tickets via an automated ticket vending machine as well as other goods. The station building features old-style wooden shingles. The station features a kumitorishiki benjo (basically an "indoor outhouse" attached to the building).
Platform 1: Geibi Line (toward Bingo Shōbara Station), Fukuen Line (toward Fuchū Station)
Platform 2: Geibi Line (toward Miyoshi Station)

Environs
Shiomachi Post Office
Basen River
Miyoshi Municipal Shiomachi Junior High
Miyoshi Seiryō High School

Highway access
Japan National Route 184
Hiroshima Prefectural Route 225 (Shiomachi Taishajō Route)
Hiroshima Prefectural Route 430 (Itoi Shiomachi Route)
Hiroshima Prefectural Route 431 (Wachi Shiomachi Route)

Connecting lines
All lines are JR West lines. All Fukuen Line trains continue on to Miyoshi Station. 
Geibi Line
Shimowachi Station — Shiomachi Station — Kamisugi Station
Fukuen Line
Mirasaka Station — Shiomachi Station — Kamisugi Station

External links
 JR West

Railway stations in Hiroshima Prefecture
Fukuen Line
Geibi Line
Railway stations in Japan opened in 1930